Biocitech Société par actions simplifiée is a technology campus dedicated to biology, which CEO is Jean-François Boussard and located at Romainville, France. Founded in 2002, it welcomes biotechnology, biopharmaceutical and fine chemical companies.

Partners 
 Agence Régionale du Développement de Paris-lle-de-France
 Seine-Saint-Denis Avenir
 Medicen Paris Region
 Paris Développement
 Centrale Santé
 Bio critt
 Info Veille Biotech
 Comité Adebiotech
 Institut Sup'Biotech de Paris

References

Economy of France